Dukinfield Dog Lane railway station was a short-lived station on the Woodhead Route between Manchester, Glossop and Penistone. The station served the town of Dukinfield in Tameside, Greater Manchester, England. The station was located off Dog Lane. The line remains in use between Manchester, Glossop and Hadfield. There is no trace left of the old station.

References

Disused railway stations in Greater Manchester
Former Great Central Railway stations
Railway stations in Great Britain opened in 1841
Railway stations in Great Britain closed in 1847